Brookside, also known as Lochburn, is a historic home located at Upper Nyack, Rockland County, New York. It was built about 1865, as a -story Italian Villa style frame residence.  It was enlarged and modified about 1890 and Colonial Revival style design elements were added.  The house features a three-story tower, sweeping verandah, and porte cochere.  Also on the property is a large carriage house (c. 1890).

It was listed on the National Register of Historic Places in 2012.

References

Houses on the National Register of Historic Places in New York (state)
Italianate architecture in New York (state)
Colonial Revival architecture in New York (state)
Houses completed in 1865
Houses in Rockland County, New York
National Register of Historic Places in Rockland County, New York